Thường Thới Tiền is a township and capital of Hồng Ngự District, Đồng Tháp Province, Vietnam.

References

Populated places in Đồng Tháp province
District capitals in Vietnam
Townships in Vietnam